The Under 17 Bayernliga (German: B-Jugend Bayernliga) is the second tier of under 17 youth football in Bavaria, set below the Under 17 Bundesliga South/Southwest.

Until 2000, the league was the highest tier of under 17 football, containing the youth teams of such clubs as FC Bayern Munich, TSV 1860 Munich and 1. FC Nürnberg.

History

Pre-Bayernliga era
A Bavarian champions for under 17 sides was incepted in 1975, alongside the Bavarian Under 15 championship. It was played as an on-off final.

Bayernliga era
The Bayernliga was established in 1988, operating as two regional divisions, a northern and a southern one, the B-Jugend Bayernliga Nord and the B-Jugend Bayernliga Süd. The winner of each division would then advance to the Bavarian championship final, an on-off game. The winner of this game, the Bavarian champions, then advanced to the German under 17 championship.

In 2000, the Under 17 Regionalliga South was established, relegating the two Bayernligas to second division status. From now on, the best Bavarian clubs would play in the Regionalliga and the Bayernliga champions played for promotion to this league.

Since 2001, the final between the two league winners was now played in a home-and-away format. Should each team win a game the goals scored were not taken into consideration, instead, a penalty shoot-out was used to determine the winner.

In 2007, the Under 17 Regionalliga South and the Under 19 Regionalliga Southwest merged to form the Under 19 Bundesliga South/Southwest. This changed nothing in the status of the Bayernligas as second divisions.

From the 2008–09 season, the Bayernliga now operates as a single division, allowing direct promotion for its champion. Below this league, two Landesligas, north and south, were slotted in above the seven Bezirksoberligas who previously formed the tier below. A final to determine the Bavarian champions will not be necessary any more, unless two ore more teams finish on equal points at the top of the table. In 2010–11, the SpVgg Unterhaching defeated 1. FC Nürnberg II 2–0 in such a decider.

In 2008, the Bavarian football association had 1,853 registered under 17 teams, a 0.7% increase from the previous year. All up, 20,699 junior teams were registered with the BFV in 2008

Champions

Pre–Bayernliga era

Bayernliga era

From 2008 onwards, no final was played anymore:

 Bavarian champions in bold
 Source: Siegerliste der Bayerischen Meisterschaften U17 (B)–Junioren , accessed: 29 November 2008

Winners & Finalists
As of 2019, this is the standing in the all–time winners list:

German championship
The German under 17 championship was incepted in 1977 and, as of 2019, Bavarian clubs have reached the final 12 times, winning it six times.

League placings since 2003–04

State-wide league
The placings in the league since 2008–09, when it moved to a single-division format:

Northern and southern divisions
The placings in the northern and southern division until 2007–08, when they were abolished:

German championship winning players

FC Bayern Munich 
 1989 
 Andreas Schöttl - Markus Babbel - Daniel Punzelt - Mate Karaula - Dieter Schönberger - Alexander Roth - Schmidt - Christian Nerlinger - Max Eberl - Gehann - Wolfgang Tripp - Bauer -  Papachristous
 1997
 Matthias Küfner – Marcin Mamzer - Stephan Kling - Stefan Bürgermeier - Simon Kelletshofer – Sebastian Backer - Benjamin Schöckel - Steffen Hofmann - Sebastian Bönig - Zvjezdan Misimović - Daniel Jungwirth – Patrick Mölzl - Thomas Hitzlsperger - Aykin Aydemir - David Reinisch
 2001 
 Michael Rensing - Markus Grünberger - Andy Balck - Daniel Brode - Christian Lell - Florian Stegmann - Andreas Ottl - Bastian Schweinsteiger (1) -  Ada Oğuz - Thorsten Schulz - Paul Thomik - Domenico Contento - Erdal Kilicaslan (2) - Serkan Atak (1) - Robert Rakaric
 2007 
 Ferdinand Oswald - Uwe Schlottner - Christoph Herberth - Matthias Haas - Moritz Schapfl - Mario Erb - Gianluca Simari - Roberto Soriano - Jonas Hummels - Diego Contento - Mehmet Ekici - Nikola Trkulja - Vincent Bönig - Yannick Kakoko (1) - Florian Elender
 2017 
 Michael Wagner - Thomas Rausch - Alexander Nitzl - Lars Lukas Mai - Marin Pudić - Tobias Heiland - Daniel Jelisić - Flavius Daniliuc - Marcel Zylla (1) - Can Karatas - Benedict Hollerbach (1) - Franck Evina - Progon Maloku - Oliver Batista Meier - Yannick Brugger

TSV 1860 Munich 
 2006 
 Patrick Rösch - Daniel Thomas - Florian Jungwirth - Mathias Wittek - Stefan Alschinger - Sven Bender - Sandro Kaiser - Lars Bender - Max Knauer - Timo Gebhart - Manuel Schäffler (1)
 Goals in brackets

References

Sources
 Deutschlands Fußball in Zahlen,  An annual publication with tables and results from the Bundesliga to Verbandsliga/Landesliga, publisher: DSFS
 50 Jahre Bayrischer Fussball-Verband  50-year-anniversary book of the Bavarian FA, publisher: Vindelica Verlag, published: 1996

External links 
 Bayrischer Fussball Verband (Bavarian FA)  
 Bavarian League tables and results  

Youth football in Germany
1988 establishments in West Germany
Bayernliga
Sports leagues established in 1988